Abraham "Abe" Benjamin Cunningham (born July 27, 1973) is an American musician, best known as the drummer of the alternative metal band Deftones.

Life and career
Abe Cunningham was born in Long Beach, California. When he was young, his family moved to Sacramento. He first started drumming in his early teens playing the drums for the band Phallucy in the early 90s. During this time, he also drummed for Deftones on the side, when the band was having problems landing a permanent and dedicated drummer. At the time when he started learning drums, he also learned how to play guitar, but growing up with a stepfather (Neil) who played the drums, he took a deeper passion with the drums. Abe's father, Sid, was also a musician and an early influence for Abe before his untimely passing. His influences include Stewart Copeland, Ginger Baker and Mitch Mitchell.

Cunningham is known for his frantic, pounding rhythms on such songs as "Knife Prty" and clever usage of tempo ("Mein"), while at the same time refusing to indulge in the double bass drum setup of many metal traditionalists. However, he does use a double bass pedal as part of his kit, as seen in various drum magazines. A BBC reviewer has praised his style for displaying "the assured expressiveness of a musician whose abilities stretch further than most metal-scene sticksmen".

Cunningham has been a long time endorser of Tama Drums and Zildjian Cymbals, and for most of his career, has played the same setup. He has been featured in various ads for Tama and Zildjian. He is an endorser of Vater drumsticks. NAMM 2017 revealed his new signature Vater drumsticks, the model is called "Cool Breeze" (which is Abe's nickname of sorts).

Abe lives in Sacramento, California, with his family. He has two sons, Sidney and Daniel, with his ex-wife, Annalynn Seal. Annalynn made a guest appearance on "MX" singing along with Chino Moreno.

Discography

With Deftones
 Adrenaline (1995, Maverick Records/Warner Bros. Records)
 Around the Fur (1997, Maverick Records/Warner Bros. Records)
 White Pony (2000, Maverick Records)
 Deftones (2003, Maverick Records)
 Saturday Night Wrist (2006, Maverick Records)
 Diamond Eyes (2010, Warner Bros. Records/Reprise Records)
 Koi No Yokan (2012, Warner Bros. Records/Reprise Records)
 Gore (2016, Reprise Records)
 Ohms (2020, Reprise Records)
 Eros (originally intended for 2008, currently unreleased)

References

External links

 Official website
 Deftones Interview With Abe Cunningham and Frank Delgado

Musicians from California
Deftones members
1973 births
Living people
American heavy metal drummers
Nu metal drummers
20th-century American drummers
American male drummers
21st-century American drummers